Wannebach is a stream of North Rhine-Westphalia, Germany. The spring of the Wannebach is in Bürenbruch, a part of Ergste, which is a district of Schwerte. It is a left tributary of the Ruhr.

See also
List of rivers of North Rhine-Westphalia

References

External links 
 openstreetmap.org

Rivers of North Rhine-Westphalia
Rivers of Germany